Christopher McRae (October 20, 1873 – January 28, 1938) was a Canadian politician. He served in the Legislative Assembly of British Columbia from 1924 to 1928  from the electoral district of Vancouver City, as a Liberal. He was the president and manager of the Alberta Timber Company based in Vancouver.

References

British Columbia Liberal Party MLAs
People from Bruce County
Politicians from Vancouver
1873 births
1938 deaths